The Immigration (European Economic Area) Regulations 2006 (or EEA Regulations for short), amended by SI 2009/1117, SI 2011/1247 and SI 2015/694 and which have now been mostly repealed and superseded by the Immigration (European Economic Area) Regulations 2016, was a piece of British legislation which implemented the right of free movement of European Economic Area (EEA) nationals and their family members in the United Kingdom. It is based on Directive 2004/38/EC. It allows EEA citizens and their family members to live and work in the UK without explicit permission.  Although Swiss citizens are covered by a separate bilateral agreement; they are treated basically the same as EEA nationals. Family members may need a special entry clearance (the EEA family permit) to enter the UK.

Legal context
The basis of the Immigration EEA Regulations 2006 is Directive 2004/38/EC. Member states are bound by the EC treaties to implement Directives into national law.  However, a significant amount of case law (or precedents), many of them predating the directive, and the historical development (see Freedom of movement for workers) must also be taken into account to correctly interpret EU law.  Still, ambiguities in the Directive and misinterpretation by the member states exist,

 which may require further clarification through national courts and the European Court of Justice.

Terminology and applications
The EEA Regulations define a number of terms in addition to the terms in the Directive 2004/38.

Core and extended family members 

The definition of a Core family member (of an EEA national) only includes a spouse or civil partner, children under 21, or dependant children of any age and dependent parents.  A person outside of this definition (especially unmarried partners) may fall under the category of an extended family member.  These include dependents of the EU citizens, members of the household, and a partner in a "durable relationship".  While the Directive 2004/38 requires member states to "facilitate entry" for extended family members, the details are not defined.  The Directive does not seem to grant any rights to extended family members.

In the EEA Regulations, the acceptance of extended family members is not explicit. UK regulations have specific criteria for extended family members, including unmarried and same sex partners. Once an extended family member has been issued with an EEA family permit, Residence Card, or Residence Certificate, they are regarded under UK regulations as family members.

Accession states

Workers from recent member states have the right to move to the UK, but their access to the labour market is limited.  The details are defined in the Worker Registration Scheme (WRS).  Nationals of A8 countries will cease to be subject to the Worker Registration scheme and may benefit from free movement under the directive once 12 months of employment with a single employer has been completed.  The transitional WRS scheme became obsolete in 2011 when A8 national workers will have the same rights as all other EEA nationals.

Completeness

The implementation is reasonably complete, although there are areas where the Directive has not been fully implemented. One example is a failure to correctly implement the Surinder Singh ruling of the European Court of Justice.

Another issue with the UK implementation of the Directive is that the UK has kept national immigration law (the "Immigration Rules") separate from the implementation of the European law (the "EEA Regulations").  While it is possible to switch from the UK law to the European law, this does reset the clock for acquiring permanent residence.  The legal situation of extended family members during this switch is uncertain, because they have to conform to both laws.  Switching from European law to UK law is possible only after the EEA citizen became settled in the UK.  The EEA national is considered settled when having attained permanent residence.

Implementation issues

By far the biggest implementation issue is the long processing time for the issue of residence cards (EEA2 applications).  This can take 6 months or longer (current processing times as at January 2009 are up to a year according to the web site).  During this time it is very difficult for the family member to start working, to open a bank account, to register with a doctor or to travel.  This issue is created and aggravated by a combination of several seemingly harmless infringements.  These infringements are:

 The initial visa (EEA family permit) is valid for only 6 months (reduced in 2006 from previously 12 months).
 The processing of the EEA2 application (which is required to be completed within 6 months) often takes longer than 6 months.
 During this time the passport of both the EEA citizen and the family member is held by the Home Office.
 While it is possible to request the passport back without cancelling the application, the current web page does not mention this (unlike the previous one).

And without the passport life can be difficult for a foreigner, because the passport is required in many situations.  Even if the passport is received back, family members often encounter difficulties because of the short validity of the EEA family permit.  For example, a GP may refuse to register the family member because the visa is not valid for another 6 months (which is not correct, but nevertheless common).

Most of these problems are aggravated by the way that the certificate of application (the acknowledgment of the application) is issued.

 The certificate of application (which is required to be issued immediately) is sent very slowly.
 The certificate of application is a generic letter without reference to the concrete case.
 The certificate of application does not grant the right to enter the UK.

The obvious solution would be issue a temporary visa with the right to work immediately, and to send the residence card once the application is completed.  A self-help option is to keep the passports and only include a copy in the application.  According to individual reports the Home Office will request the passport once the application is ready for processing, and then the residence card is issued reasonably quickly.

There are further issues, but they have a comparatively small effect.  The application forms (EEA1, EEA2, EEA3, EEA4, and VAF5) are overly complicated, ask for a good amount of unnecessary information, and ask for many more documents to be included than legally necessary under the directive.  For example, the application for a residence card as the family member of an EEA national requires that the EEA national's employer stamps the application form and provides a letter confirming the EEA national's employment. Until March 2009 applications launched by family members from outside of the EEA are judged against the national immigration rules despite the ECJ's ruling in Metock case that the imposition of a requirement for prior lawful residence is unlawful under EU law.  There are also issues for spouses that are separate but not yet divorced.

In May 2009 further regulations relating EEA applications were laid before parliament.  These regulations introduced proscribed forms for requests of EEA residence documentation.  The regulations allow the Home Office to decline to consider a request for residence documentation if the proscribed form is incorrectly completed or the individual requests documentation without using an application form.  This move has brought criticism from immigration law practitioners who argue that the imposition of a proscribed form is unlawful under Directive 2004/38.

It is possible to enter the UK even without an EEA Family Permit, using an article 10 residence card, but immigration officers are often not aware of this option, and personal reports are discouraging.

Communicating with the Home Office is usually difficult.  The advice given on the web page is also often inconclusive, incomplete or leaving out essential rights of the applicant (see applying).  Written requests for an update as to the progress of an application are met with a stock response indicating that the priority of the Home Office lies with the removal of foreign nationals.

References

External links
Immigration (European Economic Area) Regulations 2006 – UK Government
Immigration (European Economic Area) Regulations Latest Consolidated Version – EEARegulations.co.uk
Image  of an EEA Registration Certificate (pre 2011), the Residence Card looks the same but with different text.

 http://www.legislation.gov.uk/uksi/2006/1003/contents/made

European Union law
Schengen, Luxembourg
Law enforcement in Europe
Boundary treaties
Borders of the United Kingdom
International transport
Immigration law in the United Kingdom
Statutory Instruments of the United Kingdom
2006 in British law
Immigration to the European Union
European Economic Area
Visa policy of the United Kingdom